Mohamed Lamine N'dao (born 9 February 1993) is an Ivorian footballer who plays for Arar in Saudi Arabia.

Club career
On 24 July 2019, N'dao joined Belgian club Lokeren. N'dao played the first four games before he at the end of August 2019 returned to Ivory Coast to support his father, who was mortally ill. His father was later announced dead on 21 September 2019. A few hours later, it was announced that his mother also had died.

References

External links
Lamine N'dao at Lokeren's website

1993 births
People from Divo, Ivory Coast
Living people
Ivorian footballers
Association football midfielders
Doxa Katokopias FC players
Olympiakos Nicosia players
Thonon Evian Grand Genève F.C. players
Africa Sports d'Abidjan players
ASEC Mimosas players
K.S.C. Lokeren Oost-Vlaanderen players
S.C. Covilhã players
Arar FC players
Cypriot First Division players
Ligue 2 players
Championnat National 3 players
Challenger Pro League players
Liga Portugal 2 players
Saudi Second Division players
Ivorian expatriate footballers
Ivorian expatriate sportspeople in Cyprus
Ivorian expatriate sportspeople in France
Ivorian expatriate sportspeople in Belgium
Ivorian expatriate sportspeople in Portugal
Ivorian expatriate sportspeople in Saudi Arabia
Expatriate footballers in Cyprus
Expatriate footballers in France
Expatriate footballers in Belgium
Expatriate footballers in Portugal
Expatriate footballers in Saudi Arabia